The 2013–14 Sacramento State Hornets men's basketball team represented California State University, Sacramento during the 2013–14 NCAA Division I men's basketball season. The Hornets were led by sixth year head coach Brian Katz and played their home games at Hornets Nest. They were members of the Big Sky Conference.

The Hornets enter the season with a new assistant coach in Chris Walker, who was promoted from Director of Basketball operations.

They finished the season 14–16, 10–10 in Big Sky play to finish in a tie for seventh place. They lost in the quarterfinals of the Big Sky tournament to North Dakota.

Roster

Schedule

|-
!colspan=9 style="background:#004840; color:#B39650;"| Regular season

|-
!colspan=9 style="background:#004840; color:#B39650;"| Big Sky tournament

References

Sacramento State Hornets men's basketball seasons
Sacramento State